Joe Ahearne is an Irish television writer and director, best known for his work on several fantasy and science fiction based programmes including Ultraviolet, Apparitions and Doctor Who. He also wrote the screenplay for 2013 feature film Trance.

Career 
Ahearne's career began when the short film Latin for a Dark Room won an award at the Edinburgh Festival in 1994, and shortly afterwards he began working for the independent television production company World Productions. Among his work for World were episodes of the 1997 series the BBC Two drama This Life, for which Ahearne wrote two and directed another three episodes, making him the only person to both write and direct episodes for the series.

His next major production for World was the six-episode Channel Four vampire series Ultraviolet, which Ahearne both wrote and directed. Ultraviolet was broadcast in 1998 to critical acclaim, and has subsequently been released on both VHS and DVD. The series also ran on the Sci-Fi Channel in the United States, and the Fox Network in that country produced a pilot for their own version in 2001, although this did not lead to a series.

In 2002 Ahearne directed the pilot for the Big Bear Productions horror-fantasy drama Strange, written by Andrew Marshall and broadcast on BBC One. The pilot was successful enough for a series to be commissioned the following year, with Ahearne helming three of the six episodes, although the series was not a success and a second series did not follow.

Ahearne both wrote and directed the two-part drama-documentary series Space Odyssey: Voyage to the Planets for the BBC and the Discovery Channel in 2004. He was the director of five episodes of the 2005 series of the BBC's Doctor Who, for which Ahearne was nominated for his first BAFTA.

In December 2006 his drama Perfect Parents, starring Doctor Who lead Christopher Eccleston, was aired on ITV1. The following month Ahearne returned to This Life to direct the one-off reunion episode "This Life +10", shown on BBC Two on 2 January 2007.

Ahearne's project Apparitions, a supernatural series for the BBC which he wrote and directed, began on BBC One in November 2008.

Ahearne also worked on Da Vinci's Demons, a fictional adventure TV-series created by David S. Goyer for Starz and BBC Worldwide. He also wrote the four-issue Fantastic Force mini-series for Marvel Comics in 2009 and Fantastic Four Annual 32 in 2010.

In 2013, Ahearne co-wrote the screenplay for Trance, a 2013 psychological thriller directed by Danny Boyle starring James McAvoy, which was partially a remake of Ahearne's own version of the story, made for British television in 2001. He had sent the script to Boyle in 1994 after the release of Shallow Grave. Boyle never forgot it and over a decade later contacted Ahearne with the intention of making a feature film. It went on to receive mostly positive reviews.

In 2017 Ahearne wrote and directed the BBC One thriller mini-series The Replacement. The series consisted of three episodes and concluded with loose ends. Ahearne did not intend to continue the series as he preferred short series. His next project was his the "gay thriller" B&B, produced by Hummingbird Films and starring Doctor Who actor Paul McGann. B&B premiered at the 2017 London Independent Film Festival, at which it was named the Best LGBT Picture. It played at numerous other festivals and received a limited theatrical release in North America.

In 2018, Ahearne was writer, director, and executive producer for the anthology series Rendlesham, based on a UFO sighting in Rendlesham in 1980. The series starred Laurence Fishburne, who also served as an executive producer.

References

External links 

1963 births
21st-century British screenwriters
British television directors
British film directors
British male screenwriters
British science fiction writers
Living people